Al-hurra or al hurra was an Arabic title historically often given to, or used to refer to, women who exercised power or had a position of power or high status.

In a harem, the title al-hurra was often used to refer to a legal wife of aristocratic birth, to distinguish her status from that of the concubine bought at the slave market, who was referred to as jarya, and used to describe a Muslim aristocratic woman who was "free" in the sense that she was not a slave; it is related to the style Sayyida (Mistress or lady), the feminine word of sayyid (Master or Lord). However, while the title Al-hurra was given to women as an alternative to the titles malika (Queen), Sultana (female sultan) and Sitt, (Lady), there was no exact male equivalent to the title of al-hurra.

The title Al-hurra was often granted to women who wielded political power, but did not necessarily mean they were sovereigns: Alam al-Malika and Sayyida al Hurra, for example, bore this title.  Both had political offices; not as sovereigns, but as political adviser and governor respectively.

Noted title holders
 Asma bint Shihab
 Arwa al-Sulayhi
 Alam al-Malika 
 Aixa
 Sayyida al Hurra

References

 Mernissi, Fatima; Mary Jo Lakeland (2003). The forgotten queens of Islam. Oxford University Press. .

Islamic honorifics
Women monarchs
Arabic words and phrases
Heads of state
Royal titles
Noble titles
Positions of authority
Titles
Titles of national or ethnic leadership